Surveyed as K6, but also known as Baltistan Peak, it is a notable peak of the Masherbrum Mountains, a subrange of the Karakoram mountain range in the Gilgit Baltistan region of Pakistan. Despite being much lower than adjoining mountains, the Eight-thousanders and high 7000m peaks such as Masherbrum, K6 has huge, steep faces, and great relief above the nearby valleys.


Location
K6 is the highest peak in the area surrounding the Charakusa Glacier, a region which has seen renewed climbing interest in recent years. This glacier lies at the head of the Hushe Valley, which in turn leads to the Shyok River and thence to the Indus River.
The Charakusa gives access to the north side of K6; to the southwest of the peak is the small Nangmah (or "Nangpah") Glacier, and to the east is the larger Kaberi Glacier and the Kaberi River valley.

History
The first ascent of K6 was in 1970, by an Austrian party, which was led by Eduard Koblmueller and included Gerhard Haberl, Christian von der Hecken and Gerd Pressl via the Southeast Ridge from the Nangmah Glacier. The expedition had originally planned to climb Malubiting but the Pakistan government withdrew this permission after the team arrived in the country. K6 was allotted to the team instead.

The Himalayan Index lists three additional attempts, but no additional ascents, on K6.

Notes

References

 
 Andy Fanshawe and Stephen Venables, Himalaya Alpine-Style, Hodder and Stoughton, 1995.
 Himalayan Index

Seven-thousanders of the Karakoram
Mountains of Gilgit-Baltistan